Biologicals is a bimonthly peer-reviewed scientific journal and the official journal of the International Alliance for Biological Standardization. The journal covers research on the development, production, quality control, and standardization of biological derived from both novel and established biotechnologies.

Abstracting and indexing 
The journal is abstracted and indexed in Abstracts on Hygiene and Communicable Diseases, BIOSIS, Biological Abstracts, Chemical Abstracts, Current Contents/Life Sciences, EMBASE, MEDLINE, Science Citation Index, and Scopus.

External links 
 
 IABS

Bimonthly journals
Elsevier academic journals
Biotechnology journals
English-language journals
Publications established in 1973